Tia is a genus of moths belonging to the subfamily Olethreutinae of the family Tortricidae. It contains only one species, Tia enervana, which has been recorded from Russia (Siberia) and Canada (Alberta).

The wingspan is 13–18 mm.

See also
List of Tortricidae genera

References

External links
tortricidae.com

Moths described in 1877
Endotheniini
Moths of Asia
Moths of North America